Good Die Young may refer to:
"Good Die Young" (D12 song)
"Good Die Young" (Divinyls song)
"Good Die Young" (Molly Kate Kestner song)

See also
The Good Die Young, a 1954 film
"Only the Good Die Young", a song by Billy Joel
"No-One but You (Only the Good Die Young)" a song by Queen
Good Dye Young, a hair dye line created by Hayley Williams of Paramore